Charles Théodore Eugène Duclerc (7 August 1812, Bagnères-de-Bigorre – 29 January 1888) was a French journalist and politician of the Third Republic.  He was a member of the editorial board of the National newspaper.  Duclerc served as Minister of Finance from May through June in the Provisional government of France.  Later served as prime minister from 1882 to 1883 in the third Republic.

Duclerc was born in Bagnères-de-Bigorre and he died in Paris.

Duclerc's Ministry, 7 August 1882 – 29 January 1883
Charles Duclerc – President of the Council and Minister of Foreign Affairs
Jean-Baptiste Billot – Minister of War
Armand Fallières – Minister of the Interior
Pierre Tirard – Minister of Finance
Paul Devès – Minister of Justice and Worship
Jean Bernard Jauréguiberry – Minister of Marine and Colonies
Jules Duvaux – Minister of Public Instruction and Fine Arts
François de Mahy – Minister of Agriculture
Anne Charles Hérisson – Minister of Public Works
Adolphe Cochery – Minister of Posts and Telegraphs
Pierre Legrand – Minister of Commerce

Changes
13 September 1882 – Armand Fallières succeeds Devès as Minister of Worship.  Fallières remains Interior Minister, and Devès Minister of Justice.

References 

1812 births
1888 deaths
People from Hautes-Pyrénées
Politicians from Occitania (administrative region)
Opportunist Republicans
Prime Ministers of France
French Ministers of Finance
Members of the 1848 Constituent Assembly
Members of the National Assembly (1871)
French life senators